David Arnold (Vietnamese: Việt Arnold; born November 10, 1990) is a Vietnamese-American professional basketball player for the Saigon Heat of the ASEAN Basketball League. He played college basketball for the Northern Colorado Bears and the Montana State Billings Yellowjackets. He is also known as "Viet Arnold" in Vietnam. His favorite team in NBA is Boston Celtics. His favorite NBA basketball player is Kevin Durant.

Pro career

Saigon Heat ABL (2014–present)
Arnold joined the Saigon Heat of the ASEAN Basketball League prior to the 2014 season.

Saigon Heat VBA (2016–present)
With the formation for the Vietnam Basketball Association, Arnold joined the Saigon Heat side for the league's inaugural season. At the conclusion of the season, he was named to the All-VBA First Team, finishing with averages of 17.2 points, 3.0 rebounds, and 5.9 assists per game.

Career statistics

ABL

VBA 

|-
| style="text-align:left;"| 2016
| style="text-align:left;"| Saigon
| 15 || 13 || 34.1 || .420 || .380 || .700 || 3.0 || 5.9 || .9 || .3 || 17.2
|- class"sortbottom"
| style="text-align:left;"| 2017
| style="text-align:left;"| Saigon
| 17 || 16 || 28.4 || .400 || .390 || .750 || 4.8 || 5.5 || 1.4 || .2 || 14.4
|- class"sortbottom"
| style="text-align:center;" colspan="2"| Career
| 32 || 29 || 31.3 || .410 || .390 || .720 || 3.9 || 5.7 || 1.2 || .2 || 15.7

Awards and honors

VBA
All-VBA First Team: 2016

References

External links
 Career statistics and player information from ASEANBasketballLeague.com

1990 births
Living people
American expatriate basketball people in Vietnam
American men's basketball players
American sportspeople of Vietnamese descent
Basketball players from Colorado
Montana State Billings Yellowjackets men's basketball players
Northern Colorado Bears men's basketball players
People from Highlands Ranch, Colorado
Saigon Heat players
Shooting guards